Yarrabah (traditionally Yagaljida in the Yidin language spoken by the indigenous Yidinji people is a coastal town and locality in the Aboriginal Shire of Yarrabah, Queensland, Australia. It is an Aboriginal community.

Geography

History
Gunggay (also known as Gunggandji, Kongandji, Kongkandji, Gungganyji, Idindji and Yidiny) is an Aboriginal language of Far North Queensland. The Gunggay language region of Cape Grafton includes the landscape within the local government boundaries of the Cairns Regional Council and Yarrabah Council.

An Anglican church missionary, Ernest Gribble (1868–1957) in 1892 began to regularly visit an Aboriginal group who inhabited the Yarrabah area living a very traditional lifestyle. These visits by Gribble were to encourage the tribe to move to a mission settlement he was setting up. With the help of the tribe's leader, Menmuny, the tribe moved to the mission now known as Yarrabah Community. The mission was settled in 1893. Over time, many people (including some South Sea Islanders) were relocated from homelands in the surrounding area to Yarrabah.

Yarrabah State School was opened on 1 January 1892. In 2017, Yarrabah State School celebrated its 125th anniversary.

The population of community was given to be about 630 indigenous persons in 1952.

In 1957, the Yarrabah residents staged a strike to protest poor working conditions, inadequate food, health problems and harsh administration. The church expelled the ringleaders and many others left voluntarily, never to return. A few years later, the Government of Queensland assumed control of the mission. As a result, still today most of Yarrabah is Crown Land. Native Title claims here are hard to put forward, due to the very fragmented ethnic composition of this community, with many Aboriginal people in Yarrabah having been settled here from other areas, including interstate.

In 1965, an advisory council was set up which allowed Aboriginal people to give "advice" to the Department of Aboriginal Affairs, but it had no actual power and the government continued to control all aspects of local people's lives. In 1979, several community members joined a union but were stood down.

Eventually, on 27 October 1986, the community received Deed of Grant in Trust land tenure, making it subject to the Community Services (Aborigines) Act 1984, which allowed for self-governing Aboriginal Community Councils with a range of powers and controls over the land. With the passage of reforms in 2005, the Council became an "Aboriginal Shire" and gained the authority of a legal local government.

Following the 2001 Cape York Justice Study findings, Yarrabah became one of many indigenous communities in Queensland to be subject to an alcohol management plan.  Restrictions on alcohol possession commenced on 6 February 2004, with a review by 2006.  A 2012 survey for another review showed the community was divided on easing restrictions.  

On 23 July 2007, Yarrabah hosted the Cabinet of the Queensland Government in the first ever Cabinet meeting to be held in an indigenous Australian community.
On 1 October 2007, the Howard Coalition Government chose Yarrabah as the first recipient of what was said to be a 'landmark housing and welfare reform agreement'.

In 2009 as part of the Local Government Reform Agenda in Queensland, the Council gained recognition as a local government council.

In 2002, the first Indigenous Knowledge Centres (IKCs) were developed in partnership with then Aboriginal Community and Island Councils across Queensland, with the State Library of Queensland.  The Indigenous Knowledge Centre opened in 2015. The $1.9 million facility was built both for and by the people of Yarrabah, offering learning opportunities even during its construction. Funding for the Centre was secured in 2012 by Treasurer and Minister for Aboriginal and Torres Strait Islander Partnerships Curtis Pitt, who officially opened the Yarrabah Knowledge Centre on 19 November. Leeanne Enoch, Minister for Science and Innovation, was also in attendance.

Of those recorded, 97.4% identified as Aboriginal or Torres Strait Islander. The median age of Yarrabah residents was 23, compared with 38 nationally. The majority of the Yarrabah workforce was engaged as either labourers or as community and personal service workers, and worked in local government administration or social assistance services. The median individual income was $224 per week compared with $534 per week for the Cairns statistical district.84.8% of people spoke only English at home. Other languages spoken at home included Kriol at 6.7%. The most common responses for religion were Anglican 84.6% and No Religion 7.4%.

Education

Yarrabah State School is a government primary and secondary (Early Childhood-10) school for boys and girls  In 2018, the school had an enrolment of 443 students with 46 teachers (44 full-time equivalent) and 41 non-teaching staff (29 full-time equivalent). It includes a special education program. The school operates from three sites:

 the Early Childhood and Prep campus at Workshop Street
 the primary school (Years 1-6) campus at Gribble Street
 the secondary campus (Years 7-10) campus at Back Beach Road

The nearest school for students continuing on to senior years (Year 11–12) is Gordonvale State High School in Gordonvale to the south-west. There is a free-of-charge school bus to Gordonvale State High School, which is the only public transport available for Yarrabah residents. A few decades back a ferry service transferred students to and from school in Cairns, before the road to Yarrabah was sealed. This service is no longer in use.

The Yarrabah community has a public library which serves a number of purposes including access to computers and the Internet, equipment to watch movies on DVD, and educational links including a Homework Centre (a Federal Government initiative) and access to the RATEP (Aboriginal Teacher Education Program) at James Cook University in Townsville for those training to be teachers.

Facilities
Ergon Energy powers the station and the residences. Ergon Energy power lines power the whole community as far as the Oombunji are (5-10 kilometres from the town). Residents who live further than Oombunji and other places/suburbs in Yarrabah such as Wungu ('sounds of corroboree dance'), Back Beach, Buddabaddoo, King Beach, Turtle Bay and Jilji have to use power generators for electricity. People who live in these outer places/suburbs have to adapt to live without power. The area is subjected to power blackouts especially during the wet season. During the blackouts there are no cooking facilities. Some blackouts have been known to last up to five days.

Yarrabah's medical needs are serviced by a multi-disciplinary primary health care centre, which handles emergencies and general practice care, but does not have inpatient facilities. It is staffed 24 hours a day by staff who mostly commute from Cairns.

There is a police station in the town.  Issues of concern include violence, alcohol/substance abuse, domestic violence, and high unemployment. Previously youth suicide was higher than surrounding areas.

Amenities

Yarrabah has one small supermarket run by local people, two hot food take-away shops, a local bakery and a drive-in pub, as well as a service station. For most other commercial needs, people need to travel to Gordonvale, Edmonton or Cairns. The road to the community is bitumen sealed and is accessible all year round despite weather conditions.

The Yarrabah community has its own newsletter entitled Yarrabah News, published monthly since the late 1970s.

There is a police citizens youth club in the town.

The township has had a brass band since 1901 to the 1950s, until resurrected in 2013, making their debut at the inaugural Yarrabah Band Festival.  The festival itself is now held annually around October, drawing a crowd of about 4000 persons.  

Yarrabah Aboriginal Shire Council operates an Indigenous Knowledge Centre (IKC) library service located at Lot 207 Noble Drive which opened in 2015. The $1.9 million facility was built both for and by the people of Yarrabah, offering learning opportunities even during its construction. Funding for the centre was secured in 2012 by Treasurer and Minister for Aboriginal and Torres Strait Islander Partnerships Curtis Pitt, who officially opened the Yarrabah Knowledge Centre on 19 November. Leeanne Enoch, Minister for Science and Innovation, was also in attendance. Yarrabah has a long history of providing a library service to the community. Before the establishment of IKCs, the then-Yarrabah Aboriginal Council operated a Country Lending Service (CLS) as far back as 1984. In 2003, the council asked the State Library of Queensland to transform the CLS into an IKC and lobbied for funds for a new building. The CLS was operational until it suffered irreparable damage during Cyclone Yasi in 2011.

Attractions 
The Yarrabah Menmuny Museum, opened in 1996, is located in the Jilji suburb.  The museum's name comes from the local tribe leader of the late 1800s, Menmuny, who was also given the title 'King John' Menmuny, who died circa 1919.  A later elder was 'King' Albert Maywee.

Events 
The Yarrabah Band Festival is  held annually around October, drawing a crowd of about 4,000 people.

Transport

Yarrabah was formerly served by the Paradise Bus, which is based in Babinda and privately run. As of 2016, this bus service only provides a regular service along the Bruce Highway, about 30 km from Yarrabah, which joins the community of Gordonvale (south of Cairns), with the suburb of Edmonton and the Cairns CBD.

When there were no sealed roads to reach Cairns, a ferry service provided access to Yarrabah. Locals called this ferry a 'flatty'. It carried school children back and forth from Yarrabah to the city of Cairns.  A construction project to build a new wharf at Yarrabah commenced in May 2021, after the Queensland Government allocated 7 million dollars to this purpose.  It is expected when this new wharf becomes operational, regular and reliable water transport will be resumed for Yarrabah, which lies only 11 kilometres by sea from the Cairns waterfront.  

Youth can be occasionally riding some of the brumbies of the area, without saddles.

Gallery

References

External links

 
 Jabu Birriny (land + sea): contemporary stories by Yarrabah artists, State Library of Queensland

Aboriginal communities in Queensland
Coastal towns in Queensland
Populated places in Far North Queensland
Towns in Queensland
Aboriginal Shire of Yarrabah
Localities in Queensland